Fdformat is the name of two unrelated programs:

 A command-line tool for Linux that "low-level formats" a floppy disk.
 A DOS tool written in Pascal by Christoph H. Hochstätter that allows users to format floppy disks to a higher than usual density, enabling the user to store up to 300 kilobytes more data on a normal high density 3.5" floppy disk. It also increases the speed of diskette I/O on these specially formatted disks using a technique called "Sector Sliding". In this technique, the physical sectors on the disk are ordered in such a way that when the drive advances to the next track, the next logical sector waiting to be read is immediately available to the read head.

See also 
 2M, a similar program that offers even higher capacity
 DMF, a high-density diskette format used by Microsoft
 VGA-Copy, a similar program that allowed higher floppy disk capacity
 XDF, a high-density diskette format used by IBM

External links 
 FTP for the DOS tool, version 1.8, compiled .exe and Pascal sources
 Usage of the Bash command-line utility fdformat

Floppy disk computer storage
Linux file system-related software